There is significant disagreement over the number of true rose species. Some species are so similar that they could easily be considered variations of a single species, while other species show enough variation that they could easily be considered to be different species. Lists of rose species usually show more than 320.  The numbers 320 to 350 are the figures accepted by most botanists, but as Bailey has pointed out, the extreme lumpers Bentham and Hooker only allowed for 30 species, while the extreme splitter  Michel Gandoger allowed 4,266 species just in Europe and West Asia.

Subgenera and sections 

There are currently four subgenera in Rosa, although there has been some disputes over the years.
The four subgenera are:
Hulthemia (formerly Simplicifoliae, meaning "with single leaves") containing one or two species from Southwest Asia, R. persica and R. berberifolia (syn. R. persica var. berberifolia) which are the only species without compound leaves or stipules.
Hesperrhodos (from the Greek for "western rose") with two species, both from southwestern North America, R. minutifolia and R. stellata.
Platyrhodon (from the Greek for "flaky rose", referring to its flaky bark) with one species from East Asia, R. roxburghii.
Rosa (the type subgenus) containing all the other species. This subgenus is subdivided into 11 sections.
Banksianae – white and yellow species from China
Bracteatae – three species, two from China and one from India
Caninae – pink and white species from Europe, Asia and North Africa
Carolinae – white, pink and bright pink species, all from North America
Chinensis – white, pink, yellow, red and mixed-color species from China and Burma
Gallicanae – pink to crimson and striped species from Europe and West Asia
Gymnocarpae – a small group distinguished by a deciduous receptacle on the hip; one species in western North America (R. gymnocarpa), the rest in East Asia
Laevigatae – a single white species from China
Pimpinellifoliae – white, pink, bright yellow, mauve and striped species from Europe and Asia
Rosa (syn. sect. Cinnamomeae) – white, pink, lilac, mulberry and red species from all areas except North Africa
Synstylae – white, pink, and crimson species from all areas

Species 

The following species are accepted:
Rosa abietina Gren. ex Christ
Rosa abrica Khat. & Koobaz
Rosa abutalybovii Gadzh.
Rosa abyssinica R.Br. ex Lindl. – Abyssinian rose, Ethiopian rose, wild Ethiopian rose, African rose
Rosa achburensis Chrshan.
Rosa acicularis Lindl. – wild rose, prickly rose, prickly wild rose, bristly rose, Arctic rose (Rosa)
Rosa adenophylla Galushko
Rosa agrestis Savi – small-leaved sweet briar, field briar, fieldbriar (Caninae)
Rosa alabukensis Tkatsch.
Rosa alberti Regel
Rosa alexeenkoi Crép. ex Juz.
Rosa × alpestris Rapin
Rosa altidaghestanica Husseinov
Rosa amblyophylla Kult.
Rosa × andegavensis Bastard
Rosa arabica (Crép. ex Boiss.) Déségl.
Rosa × andegavensis Tchubar
Rosa arensii Juz. & Galushko
Rosa arkansana Porter – prairie rose, wild prairie rose (Rosa)
Rosa arvensis Huds. – field rose, white-flowered trailing rose, Shakespeare's musk (Synstylae)
Rosa × atlantica W.H.Lewis
Rosa × avrayensis Rouy & E.G.Camus
Rosa awarica Husseinov
Rosa baiyushanensis Q.L.Wang
Rosa balcarica Galushko
Rosa balsamica Willd.
Rosa banksiae R.Br. – Lady Banks' rose, Banks' rose
Rosa banksiopsis Baker
Rosa × baxanensis Galushko
Rosa beauvaisii Cardot
Rosa beggeriana Schrenk – (Gymnocarpae)
Rosa bella Rehder & E.H.Wilson
Rosa bellicosa Nevski
Rosa × belnensis Ozanon
Rosa × bengyana Rouy & L.C.Lamb.
Rosa biebersteiniana Tratt.
Rosa × bigeneris Duffort ex Rouy
Rosa × binaloudensis Vaezi, Arjmandi & Sharghi
Rosa × bishopii Wolley-Dod
Rosa × biturigensis Boreau
Rosa blanda Aiton – smooth rose, meadow/wild rose, prairie rose
Rosa boissieri Crép.
Rosa × bolanderi Greene
Rosa bracteata J.C.Wendl. – Macartney rose (Bracteatae)
Rosa bridgesii Crép. ex Rydb. – pygmy rose, Sierran dwarf rose
Rosa brotherorum Chrshan.
Rosa brunonii Lindl. – Himalayan musk rose (Synstylae)
Rosa bugensis Chrshan.
Rosa buschiana Chrshan.
Rosa caesia Sm.
Rosa calantha Tkatsch.
Rosa calcarea Lipsch. & Sumnev.
Rosa californica Cham. & Schltdl. – California rose, California wild rose (Rosa)
Rosa calyptopoda Cardot
Rosa × bolanderi
Rosa × canadensis W.H.Lewis
Rosa canina L. – dog rose (Caninae)
Rosa carolina L. – Carolina rose, pasture rose, prairie rose (Carolinae)
Rosa caryophyllacea Besser
Rosa caudata Baker
Rosa × caviniacensis Ozanon
Rosa × centifolia L. – Provence rose, cabbage rose, Rose de Mai
Rosa chavinii Rapin ex Reut.
Rosa chengkouensis T.T.Yu & T.C.Ku
Rosa chinensis Jacq. – Chinese rose, China rose, Bengal rose
Rosa chionistrae H.Lindb.
Rosa × churchillii W.H.Lewis
Rosa × clinophylla Thory – (Bracteatae)
Rosa × consanguinea Gren.
Rosa corymbifera Borkh. – (Caninae)
Rosa corymbulosa Rolfe
Rosa × cottetii Lagger & Puget ex Cottet
Rosa coziae Nyár.
Rosa cymosa Tratt. - elderflower rose
Rosa cziragensis Husseinov
Rosa daishanensis T.C.Ku
Rosa × damascena Mill. – Damask rose, Bulgarian rose, Turkish rose, Taif rose, Arab rose, Ispahan rose, Castile rose 
Rosa darginica Husseinov
Rosa dauurica Pall.
Rosa davidii Crép. – Father David's rose (Rosa)
Rosa deqenensis T.C.Ku
Rosa derongensis T.C.Ku
Rosa deseglisei Boreau
Rosa diplodonta Dubovik
Rosa dolichocarpa Galushko
Rosa doluchanovii Manden.
Rosa donetzica Dubovik
Rosa ×  dryadea Ripart ex Déségl.
Rosa dsharkenti Chrshan.
Rosa dubovikiae Mironova
Rosa ×  dulcissima Lunell
Rosa ×  dumalis Bechst. – glaucous dog rose
Rosa ×  dumetorum Thuill.
Rosa duplicata T.T.Yu & T.C.Ku
Rosa ecae Aitch. – (Pimpinellifoliae)
Rosa elymaitica Boiss. & Hausskn.
Rosa ×  engelmannii S.Watson
Rosa ermanica Manden.
Rosa facsarii Ker.-Nagy
Rosa fargesiana Boulenger
Rosa farreri Stapf ex Cox – Farrer's threepenny-bit rose
Rosa ×  fernaldiorum W.H.Lewis
Rosa filipes Rehder & E.H.Wilson
Rosa foetida Herrm. – Austrian briar, Austrian copper rose, Persian yellow rose (Pimpinellifoliae)
Rosa foliolosa Nutt.
Rosa forrestiana Boulenger
Rosa freitagii Ziel.
Rosa fujisanensis (Makino) Makino
Rosa gadzhievii Chrshan. & Iskend.
Rosa gallica L. – Gallic rose, French rose, rose of Provins (Gallicanae)
Rosa galushkoi Demurova
Rosa ×  gilmaniana W.H.Lewis
Rosa giraldii Crép.
Rosa glabrifolia C.A.Mey. ex Rupr.
Rosa glandulososetosa Gadzh.
Rosa glauca Pourr. – red-leaved rose, redleaf rose
Rosa ×  glaucoides Wolley-Dod
Rosa glomerata Rehder & E.H.Wilson
Rosa gorenkensis Besser
Rosa graciliflora Rehder & E.H.Wilson
Rosa gracilipes Chrshan.
Rosa ×  grovesii (Baker) Maskew
Rosa gymnocarpa Nutt. – dwarf rose, wood rose, bald-hip rose (Gymnocarpae)
Rosa ×  hainesii W.H.Lewis
Rosa ×  harmsiana W.H.Lewis
Rosa heckeliana Tratt.
Rosa helenae Rehder & E.H.Wilson – (Synstylae)
Rosa hemisphaerica Herrm. – sulphur rose (Pimpinellifoliae)
Rosa ×  henryana W.H.Lewis
Rosa henryi Boulenger
Rosa hezhangensis T.L.Xu
Rosa ×  hibernica Templeton
Rosa hirtissima Lonacz.
Rosa hirtula (Regel) Nakai – Hakone rose, sanshou-bara
Rosa ×  hodgdonii W.H.Lewis
Rosa ×  housei Erlanson
Rosa ×  hyogoensis H.Ohba & S.Akiyama
Rosa iberica Steven ex M.Bieb.
Rosa iliensis Chrshan.
Rosa iljinii Chrshan. ex Gadzh.
Rosa inodora Fr.
Rosa ×  involuta Sm.
Rosa irinae Demurova
Rosa irysthonica Manden.
Rosa isaevii Gadzh. & Iskand.
Rosa ×  iwara Siebold ex Regel
Rosa jaroschenkoi Gadzh. & Iskand.
Rosa juzepczukiana Vassilcz.
Rosa kamelinii Husseinov
Rosa karaalmensis Tkatsch.
Rosa kazarjanii Sosn.
Rosa khasautensis Galushko
Rosa kokanica (Regel) Regel ex Juz. – (Pimpinellifoliae)
Rosa kokijrimensis Tkatsch.
Rosa koreana Kom.
Rosa ×  kotschyana Boiss.
Rosa kuhitangi Nevski
Rosa kujmanica Golitsin
Rosa kunmingensis T.C.Ku
Rosa kwangtungensis T.T.Yu & H.T.Tsai
Rosa kweichowensis T.T.Yu & T.C.Ku
Rosa laevigata Michx. – Cherokee rose (Laevigatae)
Rosa langyashanica D.C.Zhang & J.Z.Shao
Rosa lasiosepala F.P.Metcalf
Rosa laxa Retz. – (Rosa)
Rosa leschenaultiana (Thory) Wight & Arn.
Rosa lichiangensis T.T.Yu & T.C.Ku
Rosa livescens Besser
Rosa ×  longicolla Ravaud ex Rouy
Rosa longicuspis Bertol.
Rosa longshoushanica L.Q.Zhao & Y.Z.Zhao
Rosa lucidissima H.Lév.
Rosa lucieae Franch. & Rochebr. ex Crép. – memorial rose
Rosa ludingensis T.C.Ku
Rosa macrophylla Lindl. – big-hip rose (Rosa)
Rosa mairei H.Lév.
Rosa majalis Herrm. – cinnamon rose, double cinnamon rose (Rosa)
Rosa ×  makinoana H.Ohba
Rosa mandenovae Gadzh.
Rosa mandonii Déségl.
Rosa ×  margerisonii F.Lees
Rosa marginata Wallr.
Rosa ×  massiana W.H.Lewis
Rosa maximowicziana Regel
Rosa ×  medioccidentis W.H.Lewis
Rosa memoryae W.H.Lewis
Rosa mesatlantica H.Lindb.
Rosa micrantha Borrer ex Sm. – small-flowered sweet briar
Rosa ×  mikawamontana Mikanagi & H.Ohba
Rosa minutifolia Engelm. – small-leaved rose, Baja rose, Baja littleleaf rose (Hesperrhodos)
Rosa ×  misimensis Nakai
Rosa miyiensis T.C.Ku
Rosa ×  molletorum Hesl.-Harr.
Rosa ×  molliformis Wolley-Dod
Rosa mollis Sm. – small downy-rose
Rosa ×  momiyamae H.Ohba
Rosa montana Chaix
Rosa morrisonensis Hayata
Rosa moschata Herrm. – musk rose
Rosa moyesii Hemsl. & E.H.Wilson – (Rosa)
Rosa multibracteata Hemsl. & E.H.Wilson – (Rosa)
Rosa multiflora Thunb. – multiflora rose, many-flowered rose, seven-sisters rose, Japanese rose, Eijitsu rose, baby rose, rambler rose (Synstylae)
Rosa murielae Rehder & E.H.Wilson
Rosa nipponensis Crép.
Rosa nitida Willd. – shining rose (Carolinae)
Rosa ×  nitidula Besser
Rosa ×  novae-angliae W.H.Lewis
Rosa nutkana C.Presl – Nootka rose, bristly rose, wild rose
Rosa obtegens Galushko
Rosa ×  odorata (Andrews) Sweet
Rosa ×  oldhamii W.H.Lewis
Rosa ×  oligocarpa Rydb.
Rosa omeiensis Rolfe
Rosa onoei Makino
Rosa orientalis A.Dupont ex Ser.
Rosa osmastonii Rawat & Pangtey
Rosa ossethica Manden.
Rosa oxyacantha M.Bieb.
Rosa oxyodon Boiss.
Rosa ×  oxyodontoides Galushko
Rosa ×  ozcelikii Korkmaz & Kandemir
Rosa ×  palustriformis Rydb.
Rosa palustris Marshall – swamp rose (Carolinae)
Rosa paniculigera (Makino ex Koidz.) Momiy.
Rosa ×  paulii Rehder
Rosa pedunculata Kult.
Rosa pendulina L. – Alpine rose, mountain rose
Rosa persetosa Rolfe
Rosa persica Michaut ex Juss.
Rosa ×  pervirens Gren. ex Crép.
Rosa phoenicia Boiss.
Rosa pimpinellifolia L. – burnet rose
Rosa pinetorum A.Heller – pine rose
Rosa pinnatisepala T.C.Ku
Rosa ×  piptocalyx Juz.
Rosa pisocarpa A.Gray – cluster rose, swamp rose
Rosa platyacantha Schrenk
Rosa ×  polliniana Spreng.
Rosa popovii Chrshan.
Rosa pouzinii Tratt.
Rosa ×  praegeri Wolley-Dod
Rosa praelucens Bijh.
Rosa praetermissa Galushko
Rosa prattii Hemsl.
Rosa pricei Hayata
Rosa primula Boulenger – incense rose (Pimpinellifoliae)
Rosa prokhanovii Galushko
Rosa pseudobanksiae T.T.Yu & T.C.Ku
Rosa ×  pseudorusticana Crép. ex W.M.Rogers
Rosa pseudoscabriuscula (R.Keller) Henker & G.Schulze
Rosa pubicaulis Galushko
Rosa ×  pulcherrima Koidz.
Rosa pulverulenta M.Bieb.
Rosa ×  reversa Waldst. & Kit.
Rosa rhaetica Gremli
Rosa roopiae Lonacz.
Rosa ×  rothschildii Druce
Rosa ×  rouyana Duffort ex Rouy
Rosa roxburghii Tratt. – chestnut rose, burr rose (Platyrhodon)
Rosa rubiginosa L. – sweetbriar rose, sweet briar, sweet brier, eglantine (Caninae)
Rosa rubus H.Lév. & Vaniot
Rosa rugosa Thunb. – rugosa rose, beach rose, Japanese rose, Ramanas rose, letchberry (Rosa)
Rosa russanovii Tkatsch.
Rosa ×  sabinii J.Woods
Rosa ×  salaevensis Rapin
Rosa sambucina Koidz.
Rosa saturata Baker
Rosa saundersiae Rolfe
Rosa ×  scabriuscula Winch ex Sm.
Rosa schergiana Boiss.
Rosa schrenkiana Crép.
Rosa sempervirens L. – evergreen rose (Synstylae)
Rosa serafinii Viv.
Rosa sericea Lindl. – silky rose (Pimpinellifoliae)
Rosa sertata Rolfe
Rosa setigera Michx. – climbing rose, climbing wild rose, prairie rose (Synstylae)
Rosa setipoda Hemsl. & E.H.Wilson
Rosa shangchengensis T.C.Ku
Rosa sherardii Davies
Rosa sikangensis T.T.Yu & T.C.Ku
Rosa sinobiflora T.C.Ku
Rosa sogdiana Tkatsch.
Rosa soulieana Crép. – (Synstylae)
Rosa ×  spinulifolia Dematra
Rosa spithamea S.Watson
Rosa squarrosa (A.Rau) Boreau
Rosa stellata Wooton – star rose, desert rose, gooseberry rose (Hesperrhodos)
Rosa stylosa Desv.
Rosa subbuschiana Husseinov
Rosa ×  suberecta (Woods) Ley
Rosa ×  suberectiformis Wolley-Dod
Rosa ×  subpomifera Chrshan.
Rosa taiwanensis Nakai
Rosa taronensis T.T.Yu & T.C.Ku
Rosa teberdensis Chrshan.
Rosa terscolensis Galushko
Rosa tianschanica Juz.
Rosa tibetica T.T.Yu & T.C.Ku
Rosa tlaratensis Husseinov
Rosa ×  toddiae Wolley-Dod
Rosa tomentosa Sm. – harsh downy-rose
Rosa transcaucasica Manden.
Rosa transmorrisonensis Hayata
Rosa tschimganica Raikova ex Sumnev.
Rosa tsinlingensis Pax & K.Hoffm.
Rosa tunquinensis Crép.
Rosa turcica Rouy
Rosa turkestanica Regel
Rosa uniflora Galushko
Rosa uniflorella Buzunova
Rosa usischensis Husseinov
Rosa vassilczenkoi Tkatsch.
Rosa ×  verticillacantha Mérat
Rosa ×  victoriana W.H.Lewis
Rosa villosa L. – apple rose
Rosa virginiana Mill. – Virginia rose, common wild rose, prairie rose
Rosa ×  vituperabilis Duffort ex Rouy
Rosa ×  waitziana Waitz ex Tratt.
Rosa ×  warleyensis E.Willm.
Rosa webbiana Wall. ex Royle – Webb's rose, thorny rose, prairie rose
Rosa weisiensis T.T.Yu & T.C.Ku
Rosa willmottiae Hemsl. – Miss Willmott's rose, Willmott's rose (Gymnocarpae)
Rosa woodsii Lindl. – Woods' rose, interior rose, mountain rose, pear-hip rose, common wild rose, prairie rose
Rosa xanthina Lindl. – yellow rose, Manchu rose
Rosa zalana Wiesb.
Rosa zaramagensis Demurova
Rosa zhongdianensis T.C.Ku
Rosa zuvandica Gadzh.

See also

Garden roses
Rose garden
Rose trial grounds
ADR rose
Rose show
List of Award of Garden Merit roses
List of rose cultivars named after people

References

External links
World Federation of Rose Societies

List
Rosa